The diplomatic foreign relations of the United Arab Emirates are conducted by the Ministry of Foreign Affairs and International Cooperation.

The United Arab Emirates has broad diplomatic and commercial relations with most countries of the world. It plays a significant role in OPEC, and is one of the founding members of the Gulf Cooperation Council (GCC). The United Arab Emirates is a member of the United Nations and several of its specialized agencies, as well as the World Bank, IMF, Arab League, Organisation of Islamic Cooperation (OIC), and the Non-Aligned Movement. Also, it is an observer in the Organisation Internationale de la Francophonie. Most countries have diplomatic missions in the capital Abu Dhabi with most consulates being in United Arab Emirates's largest and most populous city, Dubai.

Multilateral relations
UAE has joined the United Nations and the Arab League and has established diplomatic relations with more than 60 countries, including China, Japan, South Korea, Pakistan, Russia, India, Nepal, United States, and most Western European countries. It has played a moderate role within the Organization of Petroleum Exporting Countries (OPEC), the Organization of Arab Petroleum Exporting Countries (OAPEC), the United Nations, and the Gulf Cooperation Council (GCC).

The UAE believes that the Arab League needs to be restructured to become a viable institution, and would like to increase the strength and interoperability of the GCC defense forces.

The UAE is a member of the following international organizations: UN and several of its specialized agencies (ICAO, ILO, UPU, WHO, WIPO); World Bank, IMF, Arab League, Organisation of Islamic Cooperation (OIC), OPEC, Organization of Arab Petroleum Exporting Countries, and the Non-Aligned Movement.

In October 2010, the UAE was granted observer status at the Organisation Internationale de la Francophonie

As a result of the foreign policy of the UAE, the Emirati passport became the largest individual climber in Henley & Partners Passport Index in 2018 over the past decade, increasing its global rank by 28 places. According to the Henley Passport Index, as of 28 March 2019, Emirati citizens had visa-free or visa on arrival access to 165 countries and territories, ranking the Emirati passport 21st in the world in terms of travel freedom.

Africa

Americas

Asia

Europe

Australia

Territorial disputes

Location and status of boundary with Saudi Arabia is not final, de facto boundary reflects 1974 agreement; no defined boundary with most of Oman, but Administrative Line in far north;
UAE claims two islands through the Emirate of Ras Al Khaimah in the Persian Gulf that are currently controlled by Iran: Lesser Tunb (called Tunb as Sughra in Arabic by UAE and Jazireh-ye Tonb-e Kuchak in Persian by Iran) and Greater Tunb (called Tunb al Kubra in Arabic by UAE and Jazireh-ye Tonb-e Bozorg in Persian by Iran);
UAE claims an island through the Emirate of Sharjah in the Persian Gulf that is currently administered by Iran (called Abu Musa in Arabic by UAE and Jazireh-ye Abu Musa in Persian by Iran) - over which Iran has taken steps to exert unilateral control since 1992, including access restrictions and a military build-up on the island.

See also
 List of diplomatic missions in the United Arab Emirates
 List of diplomatic missions of the United Arab Emirates
 Visa requirements for United Arab Emirati citizens
 Expatriates in the United Arab Emirates

References

External links
 Ministry of Foreign Affairs of the United Arab Emirates